Berzona is a village and former municipality in the canton of Ticino, Switzerland.

In 2001 the municipality was merged with the other, neighboring municipalities Auressio and Loco to form a new and larger municipality Isorno.

Historic population
The historical population is given in the following table:

References

Former municipalities of Ticino
Villages in Onsernone